Helena Pihl (born 26 April 1955) is a Swedish sprinter. She competed in the women's 4 × 100 metres relay at the 1980 Summer Olympics.

References

External links
 

1955 births
Living people
Athletes (track and field) at the 1980 Summer Olympics
Swedish female sprinters
Swedish female hurdlers
Olympic athletes of Sweden
People from Mariestad Municipality
Sportspeople from Västra Götaland County